Mindcraft Software (or simply Mindcraft) was an American video game developer, founded in 1989 by Ali Atabek. It is best recognized for the award-winning The Magic Candle series.

History
After Ali Atabek enjoyed Ultima II, he created Rings of Zilfin for SSI. With his wife Ugur Atabek, and business partner Jim Thomas, Atabek formed Mindcraft Software to publish his next game, The Magic Candle. By 1993 the company was publishing six titles a year and had about 30 employees. The company's games were primarily developed for DOS systems, but they also developed games for Apple II, Commodore 64, and Amiga computers.  The company developed 15 games between 1989 and 1997.

Games developed

References

External links
The History of Computer Role-Playing Games Part 2: The Golden Age (1985–1993)
Mindcraft Software at MobyGames

Software companies based in California
Video game companies established in 1989
Video game development companies
Defunct video game companies of the United States